This is a list of AFL shows which have aired on Australian television, as of 2011.

AFL Game Day

Channel:  Seven Network
Years:  2008–2020
Airs:  Sunday @ 10:00am
Duration:  60 minutes

Current Cast 
 Hamish McLachlan  (Host, 2008–present)
 Tom Harley  (Panellist, 2010—present)
 Matthew Richardson  (Panellist, 2010—present)
 Mark Robinson  (Panellist, ?–Present)

AFL Game Day: Primetime
Seven Network
Hosted by Hamish McLachlan, with Tom Harley, Matthew Richardson, Ben Cousins and Jason Akermanis

AFL Lovematch
Fox Footy Channel

AFL Squadron
Seven Network
Hosted by Garry Lyon

AFL Teams
Fox Sports Australia

AFL Today
Seven Network, early 1990s
Hosted by Bruce McAvaney, with Scott Palmer

Any Given Sunday

Channel:  Nine Network
Years:  2005–2006
Aired:  Sunday @ 1:00pm
Duration:  60 minutes

Season 1 Cast 
 Garry Lyon  (co-host, 2005)
 James Brayshaw  (co-host, 2005)
 Sam Newman  (co-host, 2005)

Season 2 Cast 
 Mick Molloy  (co-host, 2006)
 Nicole Livingstone  (co-host, 2006)
 Dermott Brereton  (co-host, 2006)

Before the Bounce
(Fox Sports Australia)

Before the Game

Originally named After the Game in 2003

Channel:  Network Ten
Years:  2003–2013
Airs:  Thursday @ 8:30pm (Originally Saturday @ 6.30pm and 11:30pm)
Duration:  60 minutes / 30 minutes

Current Cast 
 Dave Hughes  (Panellist, 2003—2013)
 Samantha Lane  (Panellist, 2003—2012)
 Andrew Maher  (Host, 2005–2013)
 Lehmo  (Panellist, 2005—2013)
 Mick Molloy  (Panellist, 2008–2013)
 Ryan Fitzgerald  (Live reporter, ?—2012)

Former Cast 
 Peter Helliar  (Host/Panellist, 2003–2007)
 Damian Callinan  (Panellist, 2003–2004)
 Eloise Southby  (Panellist, 2003)
 Anthony Hudson  (Host, 2004)

Current Segments 
 Tool of the Week
 Player of the Day
 Newspaper Headlines
 Inside 60

Former Segments 
 Diary of a Footballer
 Jumping in Hot Water
 "Strauchanie"
 Lehmo's Footy Clinic
 Make a Wish Foundation

Beyond the Boundary
(Network Ten)
Hosted by Christi Malthouse

The Big League
Hosted by Peter Landy

The Bounce

(Seven Network)

The Business End
Herald Sun web series
Years:  2011–present
Airs:  Saturday @ 7:00pm
Duration:  21 minutes (3 × 7 minutes)

Current Cast 
 Sam Edmund  (Host, 2011—present)
 Paul Roos  (Panellist, 2011—present)
 Mike Sheahan  (Panellist, 2011–present)
 Mark Robinson  (Panellist, 2011—present)

Classic Quarters
(Fox Footy Channel)

The Club
(Seven Network, 2001)
Hosted by Craig Hutchison, with David Rhys-Jones (as the coach)

The Collectors
(Fox Footy Channel)

Cometti Live
Nine Network, 2002
Hosted by Dennis Cometti, with Ben Allan and Brad Hardie

The Crows Show
Seven Network
Featuring James Brayshaw and Nikki Visser

The Fifth Quarter
Network Ten, 2004–2011

The Final Siren
Channel:  One
Years:  2011
Airs:  Sunday @ 6:00pm
Duration:  60 minutes / 30 minutes

Cast 
 Michael Christian  (Host, 2011)
 Chris Grant  (Panellist, 2011)
 Jon Ralph  (News reporter, 2011)

Segments 
 Cross to Herald Sun office  (With Jon Ralph)
 Top Ten Plays of the Week
 Performer of the Round  (Presented by Chris Grant)
 Round Rewound

The Final Story
Channel:  Nine Network
Format:  Documentary
Years:  2011 (4 episodes)
Aired:  Sunday @ 12:00pm
Duration:  60 minutes

List of Episodes 
 1971: Hawthorn vs. St Kilda
 1981: Carlton vs. Collingwood
 1991: Hawthorn vs. West Coast
 2001: Essendon vs. Brisbane:

Footy Flashbacks
Fox Footy Channel

Football Inquest
Seven Network, ?–1974
Hosted by Mike Williamson, with Reg Hickey

Footy Classified
Channel:  Nine Network
Years:  2007–present
Airs:  Monday @ 10:30pm
Duration:  60 minutes

Cast 
 Garry Lyon  (Host, 2007—present)
 Craig Hutchison  (Panellist, 2007—present)
 Caroline Wilson  (Panellist, 2007—present)
 Grant Thomas  (Panellist, 2009—present)

Fill-in Cast 
 James Brayshaw  (Occasional guest host)
 Damian Barrett  (Occasional guest panellist)

Former Cast 
 Wayne Carey  (Panellist, 2007)
 Glenn Archer  (Panellist, 2008)

Current Segments 
 Power Analyser
 Good Call? Bad Call?
 Caro's Arrow
 The Burning Question
 Tomorrow's Headlines

Former Segments 
 Meet the Press

Footy Plus
Seven Network, 1997–2002
Hosted by Bruce Abernethy, with James Brayshaw and Nikki Visser

The Footy Show (AFL)
Channel:  Nine Network
Years:  1994–2019
Airs:  Thursday, 8:30pm
Duration:  90 minutes

Regular Cast 
 Sam Newman  (Presenter, 1994—present)
 James Brayshaw  (co-host, 2006—present)
 Rebecca Maddern (co-host, 2016—present)

Semi-regular Cast 
 Billy Brownless  (Alternating panellist, 2006—present)
 Shane Crawford  (Alternating panellist, 2006—present)
 Craig Hutchinson  (News reporter, 2007—present)
 Damian Barrett  (News reporter, 2007—present)

Former Cast 
 Eddie McGuire  (Host, 1994—2006)
 Trevor Marmalade  (Presenter, 1994—2008)
 Doug Hawkins  (Occasional panellist, 1994—?)
 Jason Dunstall  (Occasional panellist, ?—?)
 Chris Jones  (News reporter, 2006)
 Garry Lyon (2006–2015)

Current Segments 
 Sam's Mailbag  (by Sam Newman, 1994—present)
 Street Talk  (by Sam Newman, 1994—present)
 Almost Football Legends  (Originally by Trevor Marmalade, now by Shane Crawford/Billy Brownless, 1994—present)
 That's What I'm Talkin' About  (By Shane Crawford and Chris Sheedy, 2009—present)
 Charlie Sheen Medal  (2011—present)
 Hot Seat  (2011—present)
 Old Man Crawf  (2015 - present)

Former Segments 
 Fyfe's Footy Flicks  (Cartoonist Andrew Fyfe's satiric animations)
 Bill's Wheel  (Billy Brownless travelled to local footy clubs for a competition)
 House of Bulger  (Parody of daytime soap operas starring Shane Crawford)
 Bulger, MD  (The sequel to House of Bulger)
 Hatchet Jobs  (Chopped footage from coach interviews, 2006)
 Marstermind  (Based on Who Wants to be a Millionaire, presented by Eddie McGuire)
 Pillow Talk  (James Brayshaw or Garry Lyon interview partners of AFL footballers)
 Under the pump  (A member of the panel is questions by the cast)

Four Quarters
Seven Network, 1995
Hosted by Sandy Roberts

The Fox Footy Archive
Fox Footy Channel

Fox Footy Feature
Fox Footy Channel

Fox League Teams
Fox Footy Channel

From The FOX Footy Vault
Fox Footy Channel

The Game
Seven Network

The Game Plan (AFL)
One

The Gospel
Fox Footy Channel

Grumpy Old Men
Fox Footy Channel
With Bob Davis, Kevin Bartlett and Tony Shaw / Doug Hawkins

The Hey Jimmy! AFL Variety Hour
Channel:  SBS
Years:  2002 (4 episodes)
Aired:  Wednesday, 10:30pm
Duration:  60 minutes

Cast 
 Jim Stynes  (Host, 2002)
 Anthony Eales  (co-host, 2002)
 Chris Hawthorne  (co-host, 2002)
 Jim Krakouer  (Panellist, 2002)
 Bianca Peters  (Panellist, 2002)

Segments 
 Jimmy on a Mission
 Scoreboard Pressure
 A Week's a Long Time in Football
 Auskick Future Star
 Hey Jimmy! Sitcom Sketch
 The Lesser Man
 High View in the Stands

Just Footy / Just AFL
Seven Network, 1997
Hosted by Wayne Carey, with Wayne Campbell, Aussie Jones and Anthony Hudson

Kellogg's Junior Supporters' Club
Hosted by Kevin Bartlett

League Teams
Seven Network, early 1960s–1986
Hosted by Bob Davis, with Jack Dyer and Lou Richards

Live and Kicking
Seven Network, 1998–1999 Hosted by Jason Dunstall, with Doug Hawkins and James Hird

Living With Footballers
Fox Footy Channel

On the Couch
Fox Footy Channel

One Week at a Time
Channel:  One
Years:  2009–2011
Airs:  Monday 9:30pm
Duration:  60 minutes

Current Cast 
 Stephen Quartermain  (Host, 2009—present)
 Robert Walls  (Panellist, 2009—present)
 Luke Darcy  (Panellist, 2009—present)

Former Cast 
 Matthew Lloyd  (Occasional panellist, 2009)
 Tom Harley  (Occasional panellist, 2009)
 Matthew Richardson  (Occasional panellist, 2009)

Current Segments 
 Top 10 Plays of the Week
 Mark of the Year
 Goal of the Year
 Hard Questions
 Hero of the Week
 Villain of the Week

Rex Hunt's Footy Panel
Seven Network

Saturday Central
Fox Footy Channel

Seven's Match of the Round
Seven Network, 2002
Hosted by Rex Hunt

The Sunday Footy Show (AFL)
Nine Network Hosted by James Brayshaw, with Shane Crawford, Nathan Brown, Damian Barrett, Billy Brownless and Dr. Peter Larkins

Totally Footy
Network Ten, 2002

Talking Footy
Seven Network, 1995–2002
Hosted by Bruce McAvaney (1990s) and Tim Lane, with Mike Sheahan, Malcolm Blight, Leigh Matthews, David Parkin, Terry Wallace, Gary Ayres, Robert Walls and Caroline Wilson

Seven Network, 2014–2019
Hosted by Luke Darcy with  Tim Watson, Wayne Carey and Sam McClure.

White Line Fever
Fox Footy Channel

The Winners
ABC, 1978–1987 Hosted by Drew Morphett

The Winners (Fox Show)
Fox Footy Channel, 2002–2006 Hosted by Clinton Grybas

Yokayi Footy
NITV, 2020–present

Hosted by Tony Armstrong, Bianca Hunt (2020) and Megan Waters (2021-present), with rotating panellists, former AFL players Darryl White, Andrew Krakouer and Gilbert McAdam.

Much like its predecessor, The Marngrook Footy Show, it focuses on indigenous players and issues.

See also

 Australian rules football culture

References

External links

Television shows
Australian Football League television shows